Albert Aloysius Kelleher (September 30, 1893 – September 28, 1947) was a catcher in Major League Baseball. He played one game for the New York Giants, appearing as a catcher for the final inning of an 8-1 Giants victory over the Chicago Cubs on August 18, 1916.  He did not make a plate appearance, and did not record a fielding chance.

References

External links

1893 births
1947 deaths
Major League Baseball catchers
New York Giants (NL) players
Baseball players from New York City
Burials at Long Island National Cemetery